Attapeu Stadium is a sports stadium in Attapeu, Laos. It is used by Lao League football team Hoàng Anh Attapeu.

References

Lao Premier League
Football venues in Laos
Buildings and structures in Attapeu province